Katarina Brännström (born 1950 in Sävsjö, Sweden), is a Swedish politician of the Moderate Party. She has been a member of the Riksdag since 2006.

External links 
Katarina Brännström at the Riksdag website

1950 births
Living people
Women members of the Riksdag
Members of the Riksdag 2006–2010
Members of the Riksdag 2010–2014
21st-century Swedish women politicians
Members of the Riksdag from the Moderate Party